The Salem Village Historic District encompasses a collection of properties from the early center of Salem Village, as Danvers, Massachusetts was known in the 17th century.  The district includes an irregular pattern of properties along Centre, Hobart, Ingersoll, and Collins Streets, as far north as Brentwood Circle, and south to Mello Parkway.  It includes several buildings notable for their association with the 1692 Salem witch trials, which were mostly centered on individuals who lived in Salem Village.  Included in the village are the Rebecca Nurse Homestead, now a house museum, and the remains of the local parsonage, both places of relevance to the witch hysteria.

The district was listed on the National Register of Historic Places in 1975.

See also
National Register of Historic Places listings in Essex County, Massachusetts
List of the oldest buildings in Massachusetts

Further reading 
Gagnon, Daniel A., A Salem Witch: The Trial, Execution, and Exoneration of Rebecca Nurse. Yardley, PA: Westholme, 2021.

References

Historic districts in Essex County, Massachusetts
National Register of Historic Places in Essex County, Massachusetts
Buildings and structures in Danvers, Massachusetts
Historic districts on the National Register of Historic Places in Massachusetts